Buncombe may refer to:
 Buncombe County, North Carolina
 Buncombe, Illinois
 An alternative spelling of Buncom, Oregon
 Edward Buncombe, an 18th-century plantation owner
 wikt:buncombe or wikt:bunkum, a term meaning "nonsense", derived from 19th-century American politics